James Charles McKeagney (1815 – 14 September 1879) was a Canadian lawyer, politician, and judge.

Born in County Tyrone, Ireland, he moved to Nova Scotia with his family in 1822. He was educated in Baddeck and at McQueen's Academy in Halifax. McKeagney was called to the Nova Scotia bar in 1838. He was first elected to the Nova Scotia House of Assembly for Richmond County in 1840 but his election was overturned on a technicality. McKeagney represented Inverness County from 1843 to 1847 and then Sydney Township from 1848 to 1851 and again from 1855 to 1859. In 1857, he was named inspector of mines and minerals. McKeagney was named Queen's Counsel in 1866.

He was married twice: to Eliza Henry in 1842 and to Eliza Hearne in 1857.

In 1867, he was elected to the House of Commons of Canada for the Nova Scotia riding of Cape Breton as a member of the Anti-Confederation Party. He was defeated in 1872.

In 1872, he was appointed a puisne judge of the Court of Queen's Bench of Manitoba. McKeagney died in St. Andrews, New Brunswick.

Election results

References

External links
 
 

1815 births
1879 deaths
Anti-Confederation Party MPs
Irish emigrants to pre-Confederation Nova Scotia
Judges in Manitoba
Members of the Nova Scotia House of Assembly
Members of the House of Commons of Canada from Nova Scotia
People from County Tyrone
People from Baddeck, Nova Scotia
People from Saint Andrews, New Brunswick
Canadian King's Counsel